Dacalana penicilligera, the Double-tufted royal  is a species of blue butterfly (Lycaenidae) found in South East Asia.

Range
The butterfly occurs in India from West Bengal to Northeast India and Myanmar, Thailand and Java. and Thailand.

See also
Lycaenidae
List of butterflies of India (Lycaenidae)

Cited references

References
  
 
 
 
 
 Yutaka Inayoshi, A Check List of Butterflies in Indo-China, page on Family Lycaenidae (accessed on 7 August 2007).

Dacalana
Butterflies of Asia